Rie Rasmussen (born 14 February 1978) is a Danish actress, film director, writer, model, and photographer.

Film
After attending film school as a writer-director, Rasmussen made her breakthrough in the film industry when she acted in Brian De Palma's erotic thriller Femme Fatale, which starred former supermodel Rebecca Romijn. Rasmussen was given the role after the director was impressed by short stories she had written about her life experiences. She wrote and directed two short films, one of which, Thinning the Herd, was part of the official selection of more than 20 film festivals around the world, including the Quentin Tarantino Film Festival in Austin and the Cannes Film Festival, where it was screened in competition for the Palme d'Or du court métrage. She also appears in Luc Besson's Angel-A in the title role.

Her first feature film, Human Zoo, she wrote, directed and produced. Human Zoo was officially selected at the 2009 Berlin Film Festival and opened the Panorama section. It is a drama loosely based on the story of her adopted Vietnamese sister struggling to acquire citizenship, set against the backdrop of the conflict in Kosovo. The film highlights the problems with immigration and learned aggression. It unfolds in a non-linear storytelling structure with extreme violence throughout.

Art
In addition to her acting work, Rasmussen is an accomplished visual artist. Her oil on canvas pieces are erotic celebrations of the human form. Her book of art and photography, Grafiske Historier (Graphic Tales) was published under the pseudonym Lilly Dillon (a character from the novel The Grifters by Jim Thompson, one of her favorite American writers). As a photographer her images have been published in prestigious magazines such as Vogue Italia, Vogue Paris, and Vs.

Fashion
Rie was first discovered at the age of 16 while on holiday in NYC with her family by top scout Gail Simon Chafik who introduced her to Ford Models.Rasmussen's role in Femme Fatale attracted attention to her in fashion circles, and she was chosen as the face of Gucci under director Tom Ford. She has described her approach to modelling as portrayal of a character, saying it is very much like acting. She has worked with fashion houses like Donna Karan, Yves Saint Laurent, Giorgio Armani, Dolce & Gabbana, Fendi, Chanel, and Victoria's Secret. While working as a model she continued to write scripts and short stories, and directed smaller surf-skate videos. Most of her sketches and photos published in Grafiske Historier are from her time travelling the world or shooting magazines.

Personal life
Rasmussen has a daughter, Ellie Rose, born on 6 May 2016.

Filmography
Femme Fatale (2002) actress
Nobody Needs to Know (2003) associate producer
Il Vestito (2004) actress, writer, director
Thinning the Herd (2004) actress, writer, director; anthology film short segment
Angel-A (2005) actress
Romance the Dark (2009) actress, writer, director
Human Zoo (2009) actress, writer, director 
Ready to Wear (1994) model

References

External links

Rie Rasmussen on Facebook

1976 births
Danish film actresses
Living people
Actresses from Copenhagen
Film directors from Copenhagen
Photographers from Copenhagen
Danish female models